American Violence is a 2017 American crime drama film directed and produced by Timothy Woodward Jr. and produced by Jose Alvarado, Lauren De Normandie, Henry Penzi and Michael Long. The film stars Bruce Dern, Denise Richards, Kaiwi Lyman-Mersereau, Columbus Short, Rob Gronkowski, and Michael Paré.

With a running time of 107 minutes, it was released in a limited theatrical engagement as well as on video-on-demand by Cinedigm on February 3, 2017.

Premise
Fascinated by the root causes of violent behavior, globally renowned psychologist Dr. Amanda Tyler has an opportunity to interview and analyze death row inmate Jackson Shea. As the interview commences with Jackson's fate hanging in the balance, Amanda must determine whether or not a stay of execution should be granted.

Cast
Bruce Dern as Richard Morton
Denise Richards as Amanda Tyler
Kaiwi Lyman-Mersereau as Jackson Shea
Columbus Short as Ben Woods
Rob Gronkowski as Brad
Michael Paré as Martin Bigg
Johnny Messner as Paul
Nick Chinlund as Belmonte
Patrick Kilpatrick as Charlie Rose
Michele Santopietro as Cynthia Shea
Stipe Miocic as Hal
Emma Rigby as Olivia Rose
Michael John Long as Riggs
Willow Hale as Beatrice

Release
The film was released in the U.S. on February 3, 2017.

References

External links

American crime thriller films
2017 crime thriller films
2010s English-language films
Films directed by Timothy Woodward Jr.
2010s American films